Izaskun Zubizarreta Gerendiain  (born September 30, 1970)  is a Spanish ski mountaineer.

Zubizarreta was born in Oiartzun. She started ski mountaineering in 1997 and competed first in the Cronoescalada race in Cerler in 2006. In the same year, she became a member of the national team.

Selected results 
 2006:
 1st, Spanish Championship team (together with María Luisa Romerales)
 1st, Spanish Cup
 2nd, Spanish Championship single
 3rd, Spanish Championship vertical race
 5th, World Championship relay race (together with Gemma Arró Ribot, Naila Jornet Burgada and Cristina Bes Ginesta)
 9th, World Championship team race (together with Cristina Bes Ginesta)
 2007:
 1st, Spanish Championship vertical race
 6th, European Championship relay race (together with Gemma Arró Ribot and Maribel Martín de la Iglesia)
 8th, European Championship team race (together with Gemma Arró Ribot)
 2008:
 4th, World Championship combination ranking
 5th, World Championship relay race (together with Cristina Bes Ginesta, Gemma Arró Ribot and Emma Roca Rodríguez)
 7th, World Championship single race
 7th, World Championship team race (together with Emma Roca Rodríguez)
 7th (and 5th in the "civilian international women" ranking), Patrouille des Glaciers (together with Cristina Bes Ginesta and Emma Roca Rodríguez)
 9th, World Championship long distance race
 2009:
 4th, European Championship team race (together with Mireia Miró Varela)
 4th, European Championship  relay race (together with Gemma Arró Ribot and Mireia Miró Varela)
 7th, European Championship combination ranking
 2011:
 7th, World Championship team race (together with Cristina Bes Ginesta)
 6th, Pierra Menta, together with Marta Riba Carlos

External links 
 Izaskun Zubizarreta Gerendiain at skimountaineering.org
 Izaskun Zubizarreta Gerendiain, website of the FEDME

1970 births
Sportspeople from Gipuzkoa
Living people
People from Oiartzun
Spanish female ski mountaineers
21st-century Spanish women